Kanjhawala is the administrative headquarters of the North West Delhi district of Delhi, India. It is also a Sub-division of the North-West Delhi district.

Demographics

Kanjhawala had population of 10,331 of which 5,529 are males while 4,802 are females as per report released by Census India 2011.

Population of children with age of 0-6 is 1,344 which is 13.01% of total population of Kanjhawala (CT). In Kanjhawala Census Town, female sex ratio is of 869 against state average of 868. Moreover, child sex ratio in Kanjhawala is around 826 compared to Delhi state average of 871. Literacy rate of Kanjhawala city is 83% lower than state average of 86.21%. In Kanjhawala, Male literacy is around 90.07% while female literacy rate is 75%.

People from every religion and caste are now part of this village, which is the center of four industrial areas: Bawana, Mundka, Rani khera, and Bahadurgarh. Also Kanjhawala now boasts of its own industrial area. The District commissioner (DC), Sub-Divisional Magistrate's Office and the Revenue Court for northwest Delhi are all situated in Kanjhawala on main road MDR-8.

The most common language spoken is Haryanvi, along with Hindi.

Geography
The Mahabharat Kalin Khandav Prasth Van is situated 1 km away from Kanjhawala village in Ladpur village area, which is now known as Dada Pobhara.

References

Cities and towns in North West Delhi district
District subdivisions of Delhi